Brighton Kemptown, often referred to as Brighton Kemptown and Peacehaven by local political parties, is a constituency represented in the House of Commons of the UK Parliament since 2017 by Lloyd Russell-Moyle, a Labour Co-op MP.

The constituency covers the eastern portion of the city of Brighton and Hove including Kemptown and part of the Lewes District.

Boundaries 

1950–1983: The County Borough of Brighton wards of Elm Grove, Hanover, King's Cliff, Lewes Road, Moulsecoomb, Pier, Queen's Park, Rottingdean, and St John's.

1983–1997: The Borough of Brighton wards of Hanover, King's Cliff, Marine, Moulsecoomb, Queen's Park, Rottingdean, Tenantry, and Woodingdean.

1997–2010: The Borough of Brighton wards of King's Cliff, Marine, Moulsecoomb, Queen's Park, Rottingdean, Tenantry, and Woodingdean, and the District of Lewes wards of East Saltdean, Peacehaven East, Peacehaven North, Peacehaven West, and Telscombe Cliffs.

2010–present: The City of Brighton and Hove wards of East Brighton, Moulsecoomb and Bevendean, Queen's Park, Rottingdean Coastal, and Woodingdean, and the District of Lewes wards of East Saltdean and Telscombe Cliffs, Peacehaven East, Peacehaven North, and Peacehaven West.

Constituency profile 
The constituency takes in the eastern part of Brighton and semi-rural suburbs and villages stretching out to the east.

The seat has a large student population, from those that attend the University of Brighton and University of Sussex.

From west to east it includes Queen's Park; Kemptown, the centre of Brighton's LGBTQ+ community; the council estates of Whitehawk and Moulsecoomb; and beyond the racecourse affluent and genteel coastal villages like Rottingdean, Woodingdean, Saltdean and the town of Peacehaven.

History 
History of boundaries
This constituency was created in 1950 when the two-member constituency of Brighton was split into three single-member seats.

Boundary changes for the 1997 general election moved Peacehaven, a semi-rural area, into the constituency. This added a ward where the Conservatives had been favoured, but Labour gained the seat at its landslide victory. Des Turner held it until 2010, when Simon Kirby of the Conservative Party won it.
History of results

For a total of 48 years since the seat's creation, it has been Conservative-controlled (1950–1964; 1970–1997; 2010–2017). The only other party to hold the seat since its creation has been the Labour Party.

Labour first won Kemptown in 1964, with a narrow majority of just seven votes. Dennis Hobden, the first Labour MP to ever be elected in Sussex, increased his majority in 1966, but lost the seat in 1970, and another Labour MP was not returned until 1997. The seat was a national bellwether constituency from 1979 to 2015, but in 2017 elected a Labour MP when the country as a whole returned a hung parliament with the Conservatives being the largest party by a margin of 56 MPs.

Liberal Democrats and their two predecessor parties following national trends formed the third-largest party in the constituency, 1950–2010 inclusive. The 2010 general election result for the party can be seen as 0.6% behind "its" highest, at 18.6%, if including its SDP forerunner.  The Liberal Democrat vote share collapsed to 3% in 2015 (behind UKIP and Green Party candidates) and remained at the 3% level in 2017 despite the absence of UKIP and Green candidates for the seat at that election.

The Green Party candidate finished in fourth place at the 2005, 2010 and 2015 elections, retaining their deposit each time, with vote shares ranging from 5.5% to 7.0%. The Greens did not field a candidate in 2017 and endorsed Labour, who subsequently gained the seat with a majority of just under 10,000 votes.

The 2015 general election result had made the seat the tenth-most marginal majority of the Conservative Party's 331 seats by percentage of majority.

Members of Parliament

Elections

Elections in the 2010s

Elections in the 2000s

Elections in the 1990s

Elections in the 1980s

Elections in the 1970s

Elections in the 1960s

Elections in the 1950s

See also 
 List of parliamentary constituencies in East Sussex

Notes

References

Sources 
Election result, 2005 (BBC)
Election results, 1997 – 2001 (BBC)
Election results, 1997 – 2001  (Election Demon)
Election results, 1983 – 1992 (Election Demon)
Election results, 1992 – 2005 (Guardian)
Election results, 1951 – 2001 (Keele University)

External links 
nomis Constituency Profile for Brighton, Kemptown — presenting data from the ONS annual population survey and other official statistics.

Parliamentary constituencies in South East England
Politics of Brighton and Hove
Constituencies of the Parliament of the United Kingdom established in 1950